The Sun Fast 42 is a French sailboat that was designed by Philippe Briand as an offshore cruiser-racer and first built in 1996.

The Sun Fast 42 is part of the Sun Fast sailboat range.

Production
The design was built by Jeanneau in France, from 1996 to 1999, with 25 boats completed, but it is now out of production.

Design
The Sun Fast 42 is a recreational keelboat, built predominantly of polyester fiberglass, with the hull solid fiberglass and the deck a fiberglass sandwich. It has a masthead sloop rig, with a deck-stepped mast, two sets of 8° swept spreaders and aluminum spars with stainless steel wire rigging. The hull has a slightly raked stem, a reverse transom with steps and a fold-out swimming platform, an internally mounted spade-type rudder controlled by a wheel and a fixed fin keel with a weighted bulb or optional deep-draft keel. The fin keel model displaces  and carries  of iron ballast, while the deep draft version displaces  and carries  of lead ballast.

The design has sleeping accommodation for up to eight people, with a "team" interior or "owner's" interior. Both interiors have a main salon with a "U" shaped settee and straight settee, plus two aft cabins, each with a double berth. The team version has two bunks in the forepeak, while the owners version has a single "V"-berth. The galley is located on the starboard side just forward of the companionway ladder. The galley is "U"-shaped and is equipped with a two-burner stove, an ice box and a double sink. A navigation station is opposite the galley, on the port side. The head is located just aft of the navigation station on the port side. The owner's version has a second head just aft of the bow cabin on the starboard side.

The design has a hull speed of

Operational history
The boat was at one time supported by a class club that organized racing events, the Sun Fast Association.

See also
List of sailing boat types

References

External links

Keelboats
1990s sailboat type designs
Sailing yachts
Sailboat type designs by Philippe Briand
Sailboat types built by Jeanneau